Teepee Airport  is in Teepee, Alberta, Canada.

References

Registered aerodromes in Alberta
Municipal District of Opportunity No. 17